Flight 6 or Flight 006 may refer to:
Pan Am Flight 6, around-the-world flight on 16 October 1956
China Airlines Flight 006, aircraft upset on 19 February 1985
Grand Canyon Airlines Flight 6, crashed 18 June 1986
Singapore Airlines Flight 006, crashed on 31 October 2000
UPS Airlines Flight 6, caught fire on 3 September 2010
Flight 6 (film), a 1944 documentary by the National Film Board of Canada

0006